Shirley Ann Pithers (12 June 1935 – 9 March 2017), better known as Jane Freeman, was an English-born Welsh actress who was best known for her work on British television, mostly notably for her role as Ivy in Last of the Summer Wine.

Early years
Freeman was born in Brentford, Middlesex, in 1935, the daughter of railway engineer Arthur Pithers and his wife, Joan Pithers, née Dewhurst. She was raised in Merthyr Tydfil following the death of her father in an accident when she was 9 years old and her mother's subsequent remarriage to Russell Evans. For a time, she used his surname and was known as Jane Evans.  She graduated from the Cardiff College of Music and Drama in 1955.

Career 
After a stay in London, Freeman joined the Osiris Repertory Theatre touring company, based in Gloucestershire. She joined the Arena Theatre, Sutton Coldfield in 1958, followed by Birmingham Rep from 1968. Her stage appearances include Margaret More in the Welsh Theatre Company's first production, A Man for All Seasons, at Cardiff's New Theatre in 1962.

Freeman’s television roles include Diary Of a Young Man (1964), Crossroads (1964), Touch And Go (1978), and Hannah (1980). She was best known for her role as the abrasive but ultimately kind-hearted café owner Ivy, one of the main characters in the long-running British television comedy Last of the Summer Wine. She was one of only two actors to appear in all series of the show, from 1973 until 2010 (the other being Peter Sallis, who played Norman Clegg): however, unlike Sallis, Freeman did not appear in all of the episodes.

Her film credits included Ghost In The Water (1982), Scrubbers (1982) and Silas Marner: The Weaver of Raveloe (1986).

Personal life 
In 1971, Freeman married Michael Simpson, whom she met when he became artistic director of the Birmingham Rep while she was a member of that group.

Death 
Freeman died on 9 March 2017 at the age of 81 from lung cancer. Her age was often incorrectly reported as being 96 at the time of her death, but official birth records prove that she was born in 1935.

Roles

Television

Film

See also
 Recurring characters in Last of the Summer Wine

References

External links
 
Jane Freeman at Find a Grave

1935 births
2017 deaths
People from Brentford
Welsh stage actresses
Welsh television actresses
Deaths from lung cancer
Deaths from cancer in Wales
British comedy actresses